Dağlı (known as Əli Bayramlı until 2015) is a village and municipality in the Zaqatala Rayon of Azerbaijan.  It has a population of 2,770. The postal code is AZ 6220. The municipality consists of the villages of Əli Bayramlı, Qalal, and Qarqay.

Notable natives 

 Natig Mammadov — National Hero of Azerbaijan.

References

External links

Populated places in Zaqatala District